Goldfish is an electronic duo originating from Cape Town, South Africa, consisting of Dominic Peters and David Poole. They create dance music containing elements of house, pop, jazz and African music. The band has released a number of albums, including Late Night People, Perceptions of Pacha and Get Busy Living. They were named "Best Pop" at the MTV Africa Music Awards 2014.

History

Founding and early years

Dominic Peters and David Poole founded GoldFish in Cape Town, South Africa. The two jazz musicians had first met while studying music at college. After the 2006 release of their debut album Caught in the Loop, the group went on to open for artists such as Fatboy Slim, Mr Scruff, Audio Bullys, Stereo MC's. Basement Jaxx, Faithless, Paul van Dyk, and Pete Tong. GoldFish was nominated for the Best Alternative category at the first MTV Africa Music Awards 2008 but did not win.

They released their album Perceptions of Pacha on 29 August 2008. In 2009, they set a new South African Music Awards record for most nominations, with eight nominations including Best Duo or Group and Album of the Year, winning Best Engineer and Best Dance Album. Their album GoldFish spent three weeks on the Dutch Albums Top 100 chart, peaking at No. 44 in 2012.

Recent touring and releases

In 2011, their album Get Busy Living won at the South African Music Awards. A number of their singles have also been used commercially. An advertisement for the Kia Soul automobile featured their track "Fort Knox." Nike recently used the song "Washing Over Me" featuring Morning Parade in the advertisement of the Nike+ App. "Washing Over Me" was also featured in the Castle Lager advert for the Castle Lager Incoming Series. "Washing Over Me" also reached No. 1 on the 5FM Top 40 in July 2012.

Their 2013 album Three Second Memory reached No. 89 on the Dutch Albums Top 100. GoldFish was named "Best Pop" at the MTV Africa Music Awards 2014. On 15 December 2014, GoldFish released a remix of the Wyclef Jean and Avicii song "Divine Sorrow" exclusively through Billboard. At that point the duo had performed at festivals such as Glastonbury and Ultra Music Festival, and in March 2015 they performed at SXSW.

Musical style
They create dance music containing elements of jazz and African music, combining live instruments like double bass, saxophones, keyboards, flute, and vocals with samplers, effects and synths.

Members
Dominic Peters – production, keyboards, upright bass, bass guitar
David Poole – production, saxophone, flute, vocals

Awards and nominations

Discography

Albums

Singles

Remixes

Further reading
Interviews and articles

Discographies
Goldfish at Allmusic
Goldfish at Discogs

See also

List of jazz fusion musicians
List of trip hop artists
List of EMI artists
List of South African musicians
List of electro house artists
List of free improvising musicians and groups

References

External links

 GoldfishLive.com
Goldfish on Twitter
Goldfish on VEVO

South African electronic music groups
South African musical duos
Electronic dance music duos
Trip hop groups
Nu jazz musicians
Deep house musicians
Downtempo musicians
Armada Music artists
White South African people
Goldfish in culture